Mir Ways ibn Shah 'Alam, also known as Mirwais Khan Hotak (1673-1715) was an Afghan ruler from the Ghilji tribe of Pashtuns of Kandahar, Afghanistan, and the founder of the Hotak dynasty.

In 1709, after overthrowing and assassinating George XI of Kartil, the Safavid Persian governor, Hotak declared independence of the Loy Kandahar region, now southern Afghanistan. Hotak is widely known as Mīrwais Nīkə (ميرويس نيکه) or Mīrwais Bābā (ميرويس بابا)—"Mirwais the Grandfather" in Pashto.

Background
George XI of Kartli was a Georgian-Safavid general who was defeated by the Safavid Empire for trying to revolt in Georgia, and lent his services to the empire. He was ordered to quell a suspected rebellion and to govern in Kandahar. Sultan Husayn strongly suspected the Ghilji had revolted and sent George to Kandahar ahead of a large Persian army. When he arrived, he saw that the Ghilji were not revolting, resisting oppression. Although the Ghilji were loyal to George, he preferred to strike fear into the Afghan tribes and treated the land as if he had conquered it. With many high-ranking officials sacked, George treated the Afghans like slaves. When the Ghilji appealed to Husayn for proper representation without success, they planned a rebellion. The situation was unfavorable to them, because the best Persian general was entangled with a large Persian army occupying Kandahar.

Rise to power
Prominent amongst the Ghilji chiefs during these events was Mirwais Hotak – as head of one of the tribes, he was intelligent, well mannered, and one of the richest and most influential people in Kandahar. Hotak signed a petition to Husayn, and boosted the morale of his countrymen for a future revolt if necessary. After the petition failed, Mirwais advocated submission to the Safavids for the time being.

George noticed Hotak's great influence in the Kandahar region, and viewed him as the only thing keeping the Ghilji from revolting in Kandahar. He was determined to strip Hotak of his influence and power, and ordered his arrest for conspiring against the government. Hotak was arrested along with many other compatriots and sent to Isfahan. George, feeling safe in his governorship of Kandahar, allowed the larger part of his army to return to Persia. Hotak arrived at Isfahan, and appealed to the officials in the Persian court, and portrayed George as an enemy to them. He also demanded that Husayn investigate the charges against him, who acknowledged he was innocent and allowed him to retain his influential position at the court.

Hotak explained to the court that George would be a ferocious enemy if he rebelled, with the governorship of Kandahar, Georgia, and Kerman falling to his rule in such a scenario. He talked about George's power, and Husayn saw the possibility of Ghurghis's ambitions growing too big. Having achieved his goal, Hotak requested a pilgrimage to Mecca, which the court could not decline, and was granted permission. He wanted to obtain support and approval from religious leaders, so he asked two questions: 
"Is it lawful for Muslamans to take up arms to free themselves from the yoke?"

"In the case of which the chief men of several tribes having been forced to take the oath of allegiance to a sovereign who was a heretic, are not the members of the tribe released from the oath when the sovereign ceases to observe the convention he had sworn to?" 

The replies were in the affirmative, so Hotak returned to Isfahan. He planned to depart to Kandahar, but decided to remain in the court of Isfahan to avoid arousing suspicion.

Around the same time that Mirwais returned from Mecca, he learned of an Armenian named Israel Orri, sent to Isfahan as an ambassador under diplomatic authority of Peter the Great. The ambassador had hundreds of followers supporting him to move toward the court. His goal was more influence over Persian import and export duties, and the story was expanded upon and greatly exaggerated. When it reached the court at Isfahan, many rumors added to the alarm, and Husayn had asked Hotak for counsel, who replied: 

The arguments sent Husayn into a panic. In fear of provoking Russia, he allowed Israel Orri to travel to Isfahan, and suspicion of George plagued both the court and the Shah. As a result, Husayn reappointed Hotak to his position to spy on George, and by any means, remove him from power if he was thought to have started anything suspicious. Hotak returned to Kandahar, enraging George, who had to appoint him back to his positions. George demanded that Hotak hand over his daughter to be his concubine. Hotak, insulted, communicated with the heads of other tribes in his tent and consulted on plans for rebellion. Mirwais asked the tribes to follow him, and they waited for him to give the signal.

Hotak disguised a young-looking girl and dressed her to take the place of his daughter and sent her to George. Hotak was ready to rebel, but he had one obstacle in his way: When Gurgin Khan allowed the Persians to return to Persia, he kept the Georgians of the army as his bodyguards. Hotak informed the Tarins – tribal governors of the Pishin Valley – to stop paying tribute to George, who dispatched the majority of his Georgian troops to the region. Meanwhile, Hotak arranged members of the branch of the Ghilji tribe, with him being the chief and marched out to approach within a few miles of Kandahar. Hotak then invited the marching Georgians, including George, to a banquet, expressing his distaste for the Tarins' behaviour. 

George, not suspecting treachery, was slain. Hotak ordered George and his men stripped, and he and his allies wore their armor and set out for Kandahar, their appearance preventing suspicion. They entered the gates and attacked the Georgian army, cutting down the guards and admitting the awaiting Afghans from the rear.

Hotak dynasty
With the coup succeeding, Hotak assembled the inhabitants of Kandahar and made a speech about how the loss of George had weakened Persia, and the opportunity for freedom and liberty was now available to Afghans. Mirwais said:

Every Afghan hearing the speech felt inspired to defend the liberty granted to them. Hotak then assembled leading men of the different tribes and presented the situation to them: the Persians would likely send a punitive expedition. Hotak was given complete executive power, armed his forces, and spread word of his successes to other tribes to encourage them to join the revolt. 

On the fourth day after George's death, the rest of the Georgian dispatch returned from their campaign to suppress the Tarins, numbering around 600 disciplined Georgian men. Hotak allowed them to approach within range of musket shot fire, then directed the guns to open up on the Georgian army. He opened up another gate with over 5,000 cavalrymen to cut off the Georgian retreat; 600 Georgians managed to breach through the cavalry. Hotak pursued the Georgian army for days; though repelled, he inflicted heavy casualties on them. 

The retreating Georgians carried news of the revolution at Kandahar. The Persian court tried to solve the issue diplomatically due to fear of the Hotaks calling in the Mughal Empire. They sent an ambassador, Jani Khan, to assure Hotak that George's death would be forgiven if they allowed a Persian garrison in Kandahar. Hotak imprisoned him to stall for time and delay Persia’s preparations by refusing to answer the court. After hearing nothing from Jani Khan, the Persian court sent another ambassador, Muhammad Khan, to Kandahar. He was informed that he should "never make base proposals to men who are free". When the ambassador returned, the Persian court realized that war was the only option to subdue Hotak and his followers.

Clashes with the Persian army 

In 1710, the Persians dispatched a force under Muhammad Khan to go to Kandahar and quell the rebellion. Hotak, hearing that the army was mostly made up of Persians, advanced with over 5,000 cavalrymen and defeated the Persian army. Over 18 months, the Persians dispatched four more armies, but each was defeated. On the last attempt, the Persians advanced with over 5,000 men, commanded by Mahammad Khan, and was repelled by the 500-man Afghan army, with the Persians suffering over 1,000 killed and wounded. Amongst the prisoners from the battle was Mahammad Khan and his three sons.

In the wake of these defeats, the Persian court focused all the imperial resources of the Persian empire on Hotak. George's nephew Khusru Khan marched with a large Persian army to Kandahar against Hotak. Khusru scouted ahead after advancing to Farah, and Mirwais took positions near Ghirisk on the banks of the Helmand River, leaving the passes unguarded. Khusru led his army of 42,000 through the pass where he met Hotak and his army. The Afghans, inferior in numbers, were defeated by Khusru, and with this victory, Khusru marched on to Kandahar. He demanded that Kandahar surrender to him, but the Afghans resisted. Hotak hastened to the south of Kandahar and mobilized a force of Balochs and Tarins to march toward Kandahar. He cut off enemy supply lines, laid waste to the land around Kandahar, and threatened enemy communications. Khusru tried to prolong the siege as long as he could, but he lost two-thirds of his force to scorched earth tactics and enemy counterattacks. Khusru called for a retreat, but Hotak advanced. The Persian army was destroyed and Khusru was killed.

The Persians tried one last time in 1713–1714 with an army led by Muhammad Rustum Khan, but he was forced to withdraw in 1714 from the Afghan armies.

Death and legacy

Hotak remained in power until his death in November 1715 and was succeeded by his brother Abdul Aziz, who was later killed by Hotak's son Mahmud, allegedly for planning to give Kandahar's sovereignty back to Persia. In 1717, Mahmud exploited Husayn's political weakness and briefly conquered large parts of Persia.

Hotak is buried in his mausoleum in the Kokaran section of Kandahar. He is regarded as one of Afghanistan's greatest national heroes and admired by many Afghans, especially the Pashtuns. Steven Otfinoski referred to him as Afghanistan's George Washington in his 2004 book Afghanistan.

See also
History of Afghanistan
Safavid conversion of Iran from Sunnism to Shiism

References

Further reading 

 
 
 
 
 
 

1673 births
1715 deaths
18th-century Afghan monarchs
Pashtun people
People from Herat
People from Kandahar
Emirs of Afghanistan
Rebellions against Safavid Iran
Hotak dynasty
17th-century people of Safavid Iran
18th-century people of Safavid Iran